The High Precision Event Timer (HPET) is a hardware timer available in modern x86-compatible personal computers. Compared to older types of timers available in the x86 architecture, HPET allows more efficient processing of highly timing-sensitive applications, such as multimedia playback and OS task switching. It was developed jointly by Intel and Microsoft and has been incorporated in PC chipsets since 2005. Formerly referred to by Intel as a Multimedia Timer, the term HPET was selected to avoid confusion with the software multimedia timers introduced in the MultiMedia Extensions to Windows 3.0.

Older operating systems that do not support a hardware HPET device can only use older timing facilities, such as the programmable interval timer (PIT) or the real-time clock (RTC). Windows XP, when fitted with the latest hardware abstraction layer (HAL), can also use the processor's Time Stamp Counter (TSC), or ACPI Power Management Timer (ACPI PMTIMER), together with the RTC to provide operating system features that would, in later Windows versions, be provided by the HPET hardware. Confusingly, such Windows XP systems quote "HPET" connectivity in the device driver manager even though the Intel HPET device is not being used.

Features
An HPET chip consists of a 64-bit up-counter (main counter) counting at a frequency of at least 10 MHz, and a set of (at least three, up to 256) comparators. These comparators are 32- or 64-bit-wide. The HPET is programmed via a memory mapped I/O window that is discoverable via ACPI. The HPET circuit in modern PCs is integrated into the southbridge chip.

Each comparator can generate an interrupt when the least significant bits are equal to the corresponding bits of the 64-bit main counter value. The comparators can be put into one-shot mode or periodic mode, with at least one comparator supporting periodic mode and all of them supporting one-shot mode. In one-shot mode the comparator fires an interrupt once when the main counter reaches the value stored in the comparator's register, while in the periodic mode the interrupts are generated at specified intervals.

Comparators can be driven by the operating system, e.g. to provide one timer per CPU for scheduling, or by applications.

Applications
The HPET can produce periodic interrupts at a much higher resolution than the RTC and is often used to synchronize multimedia streams, providing smooth playback and reducing the need to use other timestamp calculations such as an x86-based CPU's RDTSC instruction. This provides improved efficiency, since the CPU does not need to waste cycles to make up for the low resolution of timers, and enables more aggressive use of sleep states, reducing power consumption. In addition to the application-level demand for high-precision clock, there are OS-level benefits in the scheduler and through the availability of a stable clock base for multi-processor systems.

Comparison to predecessors

HPET is meant to supplement and replace the 8254 programmable interval timer and the RTC's periodic interrupt function. Compared to these older timer circuits, the HPET has higher frequency and wider 64-bit counters (although they can be driven in 32-bit mode).

The HPET specification does not define the timer frequency, only requiring a minimum of 10 MHz; the actual frequency is provided to the operating system by a hardware register giving the number of femtoseconds per period (with an upper bound of ).  A popular value is 14.3 MHz, 12 times the standard 8254 frequency of 1.193 MHz.

While 8254 and RTC can be put into an HPET-like one-shot mode, the set-up process is so slow that their one-shot mode is not used in practice for tasks requiring precise scheduling. Instead, 8254 and RTC are typically used in periodic mode with a very small time interval. For example, if an application needs to perform several short (some milliseconds, perhaps) waits, it is better to have a periodic timer running constantly with a 1 ms period because of the high setup cost of an 8254 or RTC one-shot timer. This causes an interrupt at every millisecond even if the application needs to do actual work less frequently. With HPET, the extra interrupts can be avoided, because the set-up cost of a HPET one-shot timer is considerably smaller.

Use and compatibility

Operating systems designed before HPET existed cannot use HPET, so they use other timer facilities. Newer operating systems tend to be able to use either. Some hardware has both. Indeed, most current southbridge chips have legacy-supporting instances of PIT, PIC, Advanced Programmable Interrupt Controller (APIC) and RTC devices incorporated into their silicon whether or not they are used by the operating system, which helps very modern PCs run older operating systems.

The following operating systems are known not to be able to use HPET: 
Windows XP SP1, and earlier Windows versions, Linux kernels prior to 2.6.

The following operating systems are known to be able to use HPET:

The Linux kernel can also use HPET as its clock source. The documentation of Red Hat MRG version 2 states that TSC is the preferred clock source due to its much lower overhead, but it uses HPET as a fallback. A benchmark in that environment for 10 million event counts found that TSC took about 0.6 seconds, HPET took slightly over 12 seconds, and ACPI Power Management Timer took around 24 seconds.

In 2019 it was decided to blacklist HPET in newer Linux kernels when running on some Intel CPUs (Coffee Lake) because of its instability.

Problems
HPET is a continuously running timer that counts upward, not a one-shot device that counts down to zero, causes one interrupt and then stops. Since HPET compares the actual timer value and the programmed target value on equality rather than "greater or equal", interrupts can be missed if the target time has already passed when the comparator value is written into the chip's register. In such a case, not only is the intended interrupt missed, but actually set far into the future (about 232 or 264 counts). In the presence of non-maskable interrupts (such as a System Management Interrupt (SMI)) that do not have a hard upper bound on their execution time, this race condition requires time-consuming re-checks of the timer after setup and is hard to avoid completely. The difficulties are exacerbated if the comparator value is not synchronized with the timer immediately, but delayed by one or two ticks, as some chipsets do.

Besides mentioning the race condition discussed above, a VMware document also lists some other drawbacks: "The specification does not require the timer to be particularly fine grained, to have low drift, or to be fast to read. Some typical implementations run the counter at about 18 MHz and require about the same amount of time (1–2 μs) to read the HPET as with the ACPI timer. Implementations have been observed in which the period register is off by 800 parts per million or more."

Notes

References

Integrated circuits